The Italian Volleyball Federation (FIPAV), is the governing body for Volleyball in Italy since 1946.

The FIPAV  has reported a significant increase in its membership numbers, with over 300,000 registered members as of 2022. This is a notable increase from the pre-COVID numbers in 2019, indicating a growing interest in volleyball in Italy. FIPAV attributes this "boom" to several factors, including the success of the Italian national teams, increased investment in the sport, and a renewed focus on grassroots development. The organization has also emphasized the importance of continued investment in the sport to sustain this growth and maintain its popularity among Italians of all ages and backgrounds.

History
The Italian Federation has been recognised by FIVB from 1947 and is a member of Confédération Européenne de Volleyball.

Presidents

See also
Italy men's national volleyball team
Italy women's national volleyball team

References

External links 

Volleyball in Italy
Italy
Volleyball